Persoonia subvelutina, commonly known as velvety geebung, is a plant in the family Proteaceae and is endemic to south-eastern Australia.

Description

Taxonomy
Persoonia subvelutina was first formally described in 1957 by Lawrie Johnson in The Victorian Naturalist from specimens collected in 1954 by George Althofer near the upper Snowy River.

Distribution and habitat
Velvety geebung grows in woodland and forest between Brindabella in New South Wales and the montane and subalpine forests of north-eastern Victoria.

References

subvelutina
Flora of the Australian Capital Territory
Flora of New South Wales
Flora of Victoria (Australia)
Plants described in 1957
Taxa named by Lawrence Alexander Sidney Johnson